The Kestrels were a vocal harmony quartet from Bristol, England, most notable as the group through which the songwriting team of Roger Cook and Roger Greenaway first met and started composing jointly. They were one of the busiest vocal groups in England during the late 1950s and early 1960s, singing back-up behind Joe Brown, Billy Fury, Eden Kane, and Benny Hill, amongst others, and made dozens of television appearances between 1958 and 1964.

Career
The quartet's origins were in the mid-1950s, when they were in their early teens at school together. Tony Burrows, Roger Greenaway, and Roger Maggs' earliest influences were skiffle and rock and roll, and they began getting booked to play local dances. The trio expanded to a quartet with the addition to Geoff Williams, who extended their harmonies upward into the falsetto range. They quickly started to focus on singing and became established as a harmony vocal group. Their main influences were American rhythm and blues harmony groups such as The Platters and The Penguins, whom they did their best to emulate vocally.

The group members went through the Army at the same time, continuing to work together whenever possible, and it was during this period that they got their name. They initially started working together as the Beltones and the Hi-Fi's, but their manager, taking his lead from the manufacturer of the pencil he had in his hand at the time, decreed that they should become The Kestrels. It also fit in with an American tradition of harmony vocal groups that were named after birds (the Crows, the Penguins etc.).

The Kestrels' debut single for Pye Records, "In The Chapel In The Moonlight," originally released as the B-side of their cover of Jack Scott's "There Comes A Time," came close to charting in late 1959.

The group bounced briefly over to Decca before returning to Pye Records, and a long-term contract to record for that label's Piccadilly imprint. Their subsequent releases failed to chart, but they remained busy on their own performances and also backing Pye's resident star, Lonnie Donegan, on some of his records (including the 1962 gospel album Sing Hallelujah) and his live performances. The Kestrels finished their military service early in 1960, and were able to resume their music work full-time. They carried on, trying several different approaches to choosing their songs, but mostly covering American hits. In 1964, Pete Gullane left and was replaced by Roger Cook.

In 1998, Sequel Records brought out a double album pairing thirty songs by The Kestrels, with thirty songs from fellow Bristolian group The Eagles.

They had a reunion in 1997, and over the subsequent years have raised substantial funds for charity. In 2009 they released a charity CD (produced by Greenaway) entitled The Kestrels, Still Flying After 50 Years.

Geoff Williams, one of the original quartet, suffered a heart attack and died on 20 August 2010 aged 71, whilst on holiday in Crete.

See also
List of bands from Bristol
Culture of Bristol

References

External links
Listen to Lonnie Donegan and The Kestrels at last.fm
[ The Kestrels at Allmusic]
Group discography at Discogs.com

English pop music groups
Musical groups from Bristol